Ikaalinen is a city and municipality of Finland. The town has a population of 
which 
is water. The population density is
.

The municipalities next to it are Hämeenkyrö, Jämijärvi, Kankaanpää, Parkano, Sastamala and Ylöjärvi. The municipality is unilingually Finnish.

The Seitseminen national park is partly located in the municipality.

S. Albert Kivinen, a writer and associate professor of philosophy of the University of Helsinki, is a native of Ikaalinen and his story Keskiyön Mato Ikaalisissa ("The Midnight Worm in Ikaalinen") is set there.

Ikaalinen became an independent municipality in 1641. The associated market town was founded in 1858. The market town and the municipality were united in 1972 and Ikaalinen became a town in 1977.

The centre of Ikaalinen is on lake Kyrösjärvi near the highway 3 (E12).

Transport
The private coach company OnniBus route Helsinki—Seinäjoki—Vaasa has a stop at Ikaalinen.

Notable people
 Sulo Aittoniemi, congressman
 Outi Borgenström, sportsperson (orienteering)
 Oskar Gripenberg, general
 Edvard Gylling, politician (SDP, SKP), statistician
 S. Albert Kivinen, philosopher
 Jarmo Kujanpää, sportsperson (football)
 Kalervo Kurkiala, chaplain (1931–38)
 Matti Pitkänen, sportsperson (cross country skiing) 
 Krista Pärmäkoski, sportsperson (cross country skiing)
 Samuli Samuelsson, sportsperson (sprinter)
 Bertel Strömmer, architect

See also
 Nokia, another spa town in the Pirkanmaa region

References

External links

 Town of Ikaalinen – Official website

 
Cities and towns in Finland
Populated places established in 1858
1858 establishments in the Russian Empire